This article features the 2000 UEFA European Under-18 Championship qualifying stage. Matches were played 1999 through 2000. Two qualifying rounds were organised and seven teams qualified for the main tournament, joining host Germany.

Round 1

Group 1
All matches were played in Romania.

Group 2
All matches were played in Sweden.

Group 3
All matches were played in England.

Group 4
All matches were played in Belgium.

Group 5
All matches were played in Portugal.

Group 6
All matches were played in Finland.

Group 7
All matches were played in Denmark.

Group 8
All matches were played in Wales.

Group 9
All matches were played in Andorra.

Group 10
All matches were played in Croatia.

Group 11
All matches were played in Norway.

Group 12
All matches were played in Azerbaijan.

Group 13
All matches were played in France.

Group 14
All matches were played in Malta.

Round 2

|}

See also
 2000 UEFA European Under-18 Championship

External links
Results by RSSSF

UEFA European Under-19 Championship qualification
Qual